Isalbet Juarez (born 20 December 1987) is an Italian sprinter, specialized in the 400 metres.

Biography
Isalbet Juarez, born and lived in Cuba till he was eleven years old,  won a medal at the 2013 Mediterranean Games.

Achievements

National titles
He has won 1 time the individual national championship.
1 win in 400 metres indoor (2013)

See also
 Italy at the 2013 Mediterranean Games

References

External links
 

1987 births
Athletics competitors of Fiamme Oro
Italian male sprinters
Living people
Athletes from Havana
Cuban emigrants to Italy
Naturalised citizens of Italy
Mediterranean Games gold medalists for Italy
Athletes (track and field) at the 2013 Mediterranean Games
World Athletics Championships athletes for Italy
Mediterranean Games medalists in athletics
21st-century Italian people